The 17th AVN Awards ceremony, presented by Adult Video News (AVN), took place January 8, 2000 at the Venetian Hotel Grand Ballroom, at Paradise, Nevada, U.S.A. During the ceremony, AVN presented AVN Awards (often dubbed the "Academy Awards Of Porn") in 77 categories honoring the best pornographic films released between Oct. 1, 1998 and Sept. 30, 1999. The ceremony was produced by Gary Miller and directed by Mark Stone. Adult film star Juli Ashton hosted the show.

Double Feature! won 10 awards including Best Director—Video for Jonathan Morgan while the night's other big winner, Seven Deadly Sins captured eight awards including Best Film and Best Director—Film for Ren Savant. Several other movies won two trophies apiece including: Cashmere, Chloe, Dark Garden, Playthings, Search for the Snow Leopard, Tristan Taormino's Ultimate Guide to Anal Sex for Women, What Makes You Cum and When Rocco Meats Kelly 2: In Barcelona.

Winners and nominees

The nominees for the 18th AVN Awards were announced in November 1999. Seven Deadly Sins received the most nominations with 15, followed by Nothing to Hide 3 & 4 with 12 and Double Feature! and The Awakening with 11 apiece.

The winners were announced during the awards ceremony on January 8, 2000. Besides winning Best Actress—Film, Chloe also won or shared in four other awards: Best Solo Sex Scene, Best Anal Sex Scene—Film, Best All-Girl Sex Scene—Video and Best Group Sex Scene—Video. The most sought-after awards, Best New Starlet and Female Performer of the Year, went to Bridgette Kerkove and Inari Vachs respectively. Dark Garden was named best video feature, the fourth time a Michael Ninn-directed feature had won either Best Film or Best Video.

Major awards

Winners are listed first, highlighted in boldface, and indicated with a double dagger.

{| class=wikitable
|-
! style="background:#89cff0" width="50%" | Best Film
! style="background:#89cff0" width="50%" | Best Video Feature
|-
| valign="top" |
 Seven Deadly Sins
 The Awakening
 Chloe
 Nothing to Hide 3 & 4
 Original Sin
 Search For The Snow Leopard
 Stray Cats
 Talent Scout
 Three
 Trigger
| valign="top" |
 Dark Garden
 Archer's Last Day
 Cashmere
 Crossroads
 The Devil in Miss Jones 6
 Eyes of Desire 2
 The Kissing Game
 L.A. 399
 Revenge
 Serenade
 Torn
 White Rabbit
|-
! style="background:#89cff0" | Best DVD
! style="background:#89cff0" | Best New Starlet
|-
| valign="top" |
 Cashmere
 Assylum
 Big Babies in Budapest
 The Devil in Miss Jones 6' Fatal Orchid
 L.A. Uncovered
 Painting Pamela
 Seven Deadly Sins
 Stray Cat
 Risque Burlesque 2
 Rocki Roads' Wet Dreams
 Tatiana 1, 2, & 3
| valign="top" |
 Bridgett Kerkove Anastasia Blue
 Jewel De'Nyle
 India
 Katja Kean
 Leanni Lei
 Bunny Luv
 Barrett Moore
 Sonja Redd
 Regan Starr
 Sydnee Steele
 Vivian Valentine
|-
! style="background:#89cff0" | Male Performer of the Year
! style="background:#89cff0" | Female Performer of the Year
|-
| valign="top" |
 Lexington Steele Chris Cannon
 Christoph Clark
 Luciano
 Mr. Marcus
 Sean Michaels
 Herschel Savage
 Rocco Siffredi
 Randy Spears
| valign="top" |
 Inari Vachs Chloe
 Sabrina Johnson
 Alisha Klass
 Monique
 Raylene
 Serenity
 Alexandra Silk
 Stephanie Swift
|-
! style="background:#89cff0" | Best Actor—Film 
! style="background:#89cff0" | Best Actress—Film
|-
| valign="top" |
 James Bonn, Chloe John Decker, The Trophy 
 Mickey G., Taxi Dancer 
 Mike Horner, In the Flesh
 Herschel Savage, Nothing to Hide 3 & 4
 Randy Spears, Poseur
 Bobby Vitale, Talent Scout
| valign="top" |
 Chloe, Chloe Asia Carrera, Search For The Snow Leopard
 Allysin Chaynes, Stray Cat
 Racquel Darrian, Original Sin
 Raylene, The Trophy
 Nikki Sinn, Things Change 3
 Gwen Summers, Nothing to Hide 3 & 4
 Inari Vachs, The Awakening
|-
! style="background:#89cff0" | Best Actor—Video
! style="background:#89cff0" | Best Actress—Video
|-
| valign="top" |
 Randy Spears, Double Feature! Brad Armstrong, Knockout
 Tyce Buné, Revenge
 Tom Byron, Archer's Last Day
 Mickey G., Eyes of Desire 2
 Mike Horner, Sexplicity 
 Michael Raven, Mindfuck
 Tony Tedeschi, Taboo 18
| valign="top" |
 Serenity, Double Feature! Chloe, Taboo 19
 Kylie Ireland, Timeless
 Katja Kean, Millennium
 Ginger Lynn, Torn
 Missy, Desperate Measures
 Raylene, Manic Behavior
 Stephanie Swift, Crossroads
|-
! style="background:#89cff0" | Best Director—Film
! style="background:#89cff0" | Best Director—Video
|-
| valign="top" |
 Ren Savant, Seven Deadly Sins James Avalon, Nothing to Hide 3 & 4
 Andrew Blake, Playthings
 Nic Cramer, Trigger
 Kris Kramski, Chloe
 Nicholas Orleans, Search For The Snow Leopard
 Ralph Parfait, Three
 Ed Powers, Tight Shots: The Movie
 Paul Thomas, The Awakening
 Michael Zen, Things Change 3 & 4
| valign="top" |
 Jonathan Morgan, Double Feature! Brad Armstrong, The Kissing Game
 Charley Crow, Archer's Last Day
 Toshi Gold, Succubus: Skin XVII
 Cash Markman, Pleasureville
 Michael Ninn, Dark Garden
 Antonio Passolini, The Devil In Miss Jones 6
 Simon Poe, Windsong 
 Michael Raven, White Rabbit
 Candida Royalle, Eyes of Desire 2
 Jane Waters, Return of the Nightstalker
 Michael Zen, Taboo 19
|-
! style="background:#89cff0" | Best All-Sex Film
! style="background:#89cff0" | Best All-Sex Video
|-
| valign="top" |
 Playthings Daydreamer
 Hell on Heels
 Pin-Ups
 Tropic of Eros
| valign="top" |
 Voyeur 12 Asswoman: The Rebirth
 Fleshpot
 Fresh Meat 7
 Katja Kean's Sports Spectacular 
 Porno Playground
 Return of the Nightstalker
 Slutwoman
 Street Meat
 Whispers
 White Trash Whore 12
 Windsong
|-
! style="background:#89cff0" | Top Selling Tape 1999
! style="background:#89cff0" | Top Renting Tape 1999
|-
| valign="top" |
 The Houston 620| valign="top" |
 The Devil in Miss Jones 6|-
! style="background:#89cff0" | Best Comedy
! style="background:#89cff0" | Best Vignette Tape
|-
| valign="top" |
 Double Feature! Chamber of Whores 2: Porn World
 Eye Candy Refocused
 Hardcore Championship Fucking
 Lizzy Borden's Pornoflick
 Missionary Position Impossible
 Nymph Fever
 Pleasureville
 Shooting Sex
 Tai Blow Job
 Tight Shots: The Movie
 XXX Trek: The Final Orgasm
| valign="top" |
 Sodomania 28 Barely Legal 
 Conflict
 Daydream
 Just Fuckin' and Suckin' 4
 Kelly the Coed 2 
 Perverted Stories 22 
 PickUp Lines 34
 Pleasure Highway
 Porno Playground
|-
! style="background:#89cff0" | Best Anal-Themed Tape
! style="background:#89cff0" | Best Gonzo Video
|-
| valign="top" |
 Tristan Taormino's Ultimate Guide to Anal Sex for Women Anal Demonstrative
 Assman 9
 Caught From Behind 29
 Cornhole Armageddon
 Only the A Hole 8
 Rocco's True Anal Stories 8
 Sean Michaels Rocks That Ass 2
 Stop My Ass Is On Fire
 Tails of Perversity 6
 Up Your Ass 12
 Young and Anal 14
| valign="top" |
 Ben Dover's The Booty Bandit Beach Bunnies With Big Browneyes 5
 Cumback Pussy 17
 Essentially Shayla
 Knocking at Heaven's Back Door
 Max World 17
 "Please!" 2
 Pornological 3
 Return of the Cumm Brothers
 Whack Attack 3
 World Sex Tour 17
|-
! style="background:#89cff0" | Hot Video Award (Best U.S. Release in Europe)
! style="background:#89cff0" | Best Foreign Vignette Tape
|-
| valign="top" |
 Eros Cashmere
 Delirious
 The Devil in Miss Jones 6
 Flashpoint
 In The Flesh
 Phoenix Rising
 The Rear Arrangers
 Ritual
 Skin Unbound
| valign="top" |
 When Rocco Meats Kelly 2: In Barcelona Assman 8
 Czech Cherry Poppers: The College Years 4
 Debauchery 2
 Euro Angels 14
 Euro Angels: Hardball 3
 European Sex Chronicles 
 Lil' Women 15: Sorority Rush
 Return to Planet Sexxx
 Penetrating the East 3
 Rocco: Animal Trainer
 Xtreme Desires
|-
! style="background:#89cff0" | Best Ethnic-Themed Series
! style="background:#89cff0" | Best Gonzo Series
|-
| valign="top" |
 My Baby Got Back Black Dirty Debutantes
 Black Panty Chronicles
 Black Pearls
 Bootylicious
 Booty Talk
 Freaks, Whoes and Flows
 Inner City Black Cheerleader Search
 Rocks That Ass
 South Central Hookers
 Sugar Walls
 24/7
| valign="top" |
 Seymore Butts Action Sports Sex
 Beach Bunnies With Big Browneyes
 Ben Dover
 Freshman Fantasies
 Hardcore Junior College Schoolgirls
 Hot Bods and Tail Pipe
 "Please!"
 Real Sex Magazine
 Whack Attack
 World Sex Tour
|-
! style="background:#89cff0" | Best Couples Sex Scene—Film
! style="background:#89cff0" | Best Couples Sex Scene—Video
|-
| valign="top" |
 Asia Carrera, James Bonn, Search for the Snow Leopard Stephanie Swift, Vince Vouyer, Debbie Does Dallas 99
 Gwen Summers, Julian, Nothing to Hide 3 & 4
 Lea Martini, Ramon, Pin-Ups
 Randy Spears, Allysin Chaynes, Poser
 James Bonn, Azlea Antistia, Seven Deadly Sins
 Nick East, Heather Hunter, Star Hunter
 Inari Vachs, Jake Steed, Stray Cat
 Olga Rios, Bobby Vitale, Talent Scout
 Misty Rain, Mark Davis, Things Change 3
 Inari Vachs, Evan Stone, Three
 Shaena Steel, Ed Powers, Tight Shots: The Movie
| valign="top" |
 Zoë, Van Damage, Hardcore Championship Fucking Anastasia Blue, Billy Glide, Barely Legal
 Tera Patrick, Mickey G., Crossroads
 Lena, Alec Metro, Freshman Fantasies 22
 Keper Real, Jake Steed, Fresh Meat 7
 Missy, Herschel Savage, The Kissing Game
 Allysin Chaynes, Mark Vega, Psychedelisex
 Brandon Iron, Katie June, Real Sex Magazine 18
 Tiffany Mynx, Paul Carrigan, Return of the Nightstalker
 Alex Sanders, Phaedra Alexis, Sodomania 28
 John Decker, Ginger Lynn, Torn
 Sean Michaels, Chloe, We Go Deep
|-
! style="background:#89cff0" | Best All-Girl Sex Scene—Film
! style="background:#89cff0" | Best All-Girl Sex Scene—Video
|-
| valign="top" |
 Janine, Julia Ann, Seven Deadly Sins Claudia Chase, Sheila Stone, Amber Michaels, Day Dreamer
 Jenna Jameson, Felecia, Stephanie Swift, Hell on Heels
 Ashley, Karin, Playthings
 Dee, Leanni Lei, Deva Station, Statues
 Devon, Maya Divine, Devinn Lane, Three
 Inari Vachs, Katie Gold, Trial By Copulation
 Alex Taylor, Raylene, Charlie, Wildlife
| valign="top" |
 Alisha Klass, Chloe, Tampa Tushy Fest Nikita, Lisa Belle, Dark Garden
 Sorority Hazing Scene (Allysin Chaynes, Gwen Summers, Katie Gold, Kristin), Kelly the Coed 2
 RayVeness, Shanna McCullough, Lipstick Lesbians 6
 Inari Vachs, Monique DeMoan, Mia Smiles, Nasty Girls 20
 Eight-Girl Orgy, No Man's Land 26
 Annabel Chong, Eden Rae, Poison Candy (second scene)
 Jill Kelly, Katie Gold, Porno Playground
 Chaz Vincent, Cheyenne Silver, Rocks That Ass 3
 Roxanne Hall, Alexandra Nice, Slutwoman
 Chloe, Ginger Lynn, Torn
 The Group Finale (Dyanna Lauren, Heather Hunter, Janine, Jenteal, Kobe Tai, Leslie Glass, Tia Bella), Where The Boys Aren't 11
|}

 Additional Award Winners 

These awards were announced, but not presented, in two winners-only segments read by Taylor Hayes and Christi Lake during the event. Trophies were given to the recipients off-stage:

 The Adult Video Nudes Award: Kid Vegas: Whoremaster
 Best All-Girl Feature: The 4 Finger Club 2
 Best All-Girl Series: The Violation of ...
 Best Alternative Video: DreamGirls—Real Adventures 5
 Best Anal Sex Scene—Video: Anastasia Blue, Lexington Steele, Whack Attack 6
 Best Anal Sex Scene—Film: Chloe, Chris Cannon, Breaking Up
 Best Anal-Themed Series: Rocco's True Anal Stories
 Best Art Direction—Video: Double Feature!
 Best Art Direction—Film: Seven Deadly Sins
 Best Cinematography: Johnny English, Search For The Snow Leopard
 Best Classic Release on DVD: The Devil in Miss Jones, Part III & IV
 Best Continuing Video Series: The Voyeur
 Best Director—Foreign: Anita Rinaldi, Return to Planet Sexxx
 Best DVD Extras: Electric Sex, Digital Sin
 Best Ethnic-Themed Video: Freaks, Whoes and Flows 10
 Best Film Editing: Ren Savant, Seven Deadly Sins
 Best Foreign Feature: Amanda's Diary 2
 Best Group Sex Scene—Film: Wendi Knight, Brandon Iron, Pat Myne, Michael J. Cox, Nothing to Hide 3 & 4
 Best Group Sex Scene—Video: Final Orgy (Chandler, Chloe, Inari Vachs, Ava Vincent, Nina Hartley, Sydnee Steele, Tristan Taormino, Kyle Stone, Nacho Vidal, Tony Tedeschi), Tristan Taormino's Ultimate Guide to Anal Sex for Women
 Best Interactive DVD: Vivid Virtual Vixens
 Best Non-Sex Performance: Anthony Crane, Double Feature!
 Best Oral-Themed Series: Blowjob Adventures of Dr. Fellatio
 Best Oral-Themed Feature: Shut Up and Blow Me! 14
 Best Overall Marketing Campaign—Company Image: Vivid Video
 Best Overall Marketing Campaign—Individual Project: Condom PSAs, Wicked Pictures; Wrestling Promotion, Extreme Associates (tie)
 Best Packaging: Double Feature! Wicked Pictures
 Best Pro-Am or Amateur Line: Homegrown Video
 Best Pro-Am or Amateur Tape: GM Video #242: Labor Day Wet T&A '99, Vols. 1–3
 Best Screenplay—Film: Ren Savant, Eugenie Brown, Seven Deadly Sins 
 Best Screenplay—Video: Martin Brimmer, Double Feature!
 Best Sex Scene in a Foreign Release: Rocco Siffredi, Kelly, Alba Dea Monte, Nacho Vidal, When Rocco Meats Kelly 2: In Barcelona
 Best Solo Sex Scene: Chloe, What Makes You Cum
 Best Special Effects: Michael Ninn, Cashmere 
 Best Specialty Tape—Big Bust: Natural Wonders of the World 5
 Best Specialty Tape—Bondage & D/s: Rough Sex 1
 Best Specialty Tape—Other Genre: Barefoot Confidential 2
 Best Specialty Tape—Spanking: Spanking Hotline
 Best Supporting Actor—Film: Michael J. Cox, Seven Deadly Sins
 Best Supporting Actor—Video: Tom Byron, L.A. 399
 Best Supporting Actress—Film: Janine, Seven Deadly Sins
 Best Supporting Actress—Video: Shanna McCullough, Double Feature!
 Best Tease Performance: Dahlia Grey, Playthings
 Best Trannie Tape: Rogue Adventures 3: Big-Ass She-Males
 Best Video Editing: Jonathan Morgan, Double Feature!
 Best Videography: Barry Wood, Dark Garden
 Best Vignette Series: Perverted Stories
 Most Outrageous Sex Scene: Mila, Herschel Savage and Dave Hardman in "The Devil Made Her Do It," Perverted Stories 22
 Safe Sex Award:''' What Makes You Cum?, VCA Xplicit

 Honorary AVN Awards 

AVN Special Achievement Award/Reuben Sturman Award

 Howard Stern, David Sturman

Hall of Fame

AVN Hall of Fame inductees for 2000 were: No announcement at the show

Multiple nominations and awards

The following releases received the most nominations.

 The following 12 releases received multiple awards:

Presenters and performers

The following individuals presented awards or performed musical numbers or comedy. The show's trophy girls were Layla and Alexa Rae.

 Presenters  (in order of appearance) 

Performers

 Ceremony information 

For 2000, the event was moved to the eight-month-old Venetian Hotel and Casino and Genesis magazine noted the annual show "was as much style as substance as several thousand porn stars, directors, producers and fans poured into the massive ballroom."

Following criticism of the previous year's four-hour show, host Juli Ashton announced she was going to try to keep the 2000 show short; it ended up running slightly longer than two hours.

Alisha Klass tried to shock the audience during the show, first by coming out wearing a microscopic dress and with a ball-gag in her mouth to announce the winner of Best New Starlet, then later by pulling off her clothes as adult stars jumped on stage to dance to orchestra Jimmie Lykes and the Club Swingers prior to announcement of the final two awards.

AVN founder Paul Fishbein, who presented the AVN Special Achievement awards, announced they were being renamed the Reuben Sturman Memorial Award to honor Sturman for his contributions to the industry. Meanwhile, when Howard Stern refused to attend and accept his Achievement Award, Beetlejuice took to the podium to accept on his behalf and "rambled incomprehensibly" and had to be interrupted to stop what seemed like an endless speech.

Meanwhile, Hustler noted, "This year's AVN Awards inspired many catcalls and boos from the allies of losing nominees, prompting Jill Kelly to remark that the camaraderie of past awards shows had been replaced with a mean-spirited competitiveness this year."

Several new awards were introduced for this years show; among them: Best Specialty Tape—Big Bust. The show was recorded and a video of the awards show was issued by VCA Pictures.

Performance of year's moviesThe Houston 620 was announced as the adult movie industry's top selling movie while The Devil in Miss Jones 6'' was the top renting movie of the previous year.

In Memoriam

The annual moment of silence tribute for those who died during the past year, presented by AVN founder Paul Fishbein, honored the following people: Bob Vosse, Bruce Walker, Stanley Fleischman, Paul Wisner, Kim Kataine, Albert Sanchez, David Chandler, Lou Perraino and Rene Bond.

See also

 AVN Award
 AVN Best New Starlet Award
 AVN Award for Male Performer of the Year
 AVN Award for Male Foreign Performer of the Year
 AVN Female Performer of the Year Award
 List of members of the AVN Hall of Fame
 2000 GayVN Awards

Notes

References

External links

 
 AVN 2000 Nominations (archived at Wayback Machine, March 2, 2000)
 AVN 2000 Winners (archived at Wayback Machine, March 3, 2000)
 Adult Video News Awards  at the Internet Movie Database
 
 
 

AVN Awards
1999 film awards